Sigmund Gottfried Spaeth (April 10, 1885 – November 12, 1965) was an American musicologist who traced the sources and origins of popular songs to their folk and classical roots. Presenting his findings through books, lectures, liner notes, newspapers, radio and television, he became known as the "Tune Detective".

Biography
Spaeth was born in Philadelphia, Pennsylvania, the son of Adolph Spaeth and Harriet Reynolds Krauth Spaeth. His father, his grandfather Charles Porterfield Krauth and his great-grandfather Charles Philip Krauth were all Lutheran clergymen. He attended Haverford College (where he composed the "Haverford Harmony Song") and went to Princeton where he did his Ph.D. thesis on "Milton's Knowledge of Music". He taught school and worked for Life, The New York Times, the Evening Mail and the Boston Evening Transcript.

He composed the music score for the silent film The Magic Flame (considered lost), with Ronald Colman and Vilma Bánky; and wrote the lyrics of one of the songs in The Trespasser (1929), the talkie debut of Gloria Swanson. His books include Read 'Em and Weep, Weep Some More, My Lady, A History of Popular Music in America, The Common Sense of Music, Fifty Years With Music, The Importance of Music and Stories Behind the World's Greatest Music.

On NBC, his program of piano instruction, Keys to Happiness (1931), brought an avalanche of 4000 fan letters each week. In November, 1931 he began his 15-minute NBC program, The Tune Detective, airing Tuesdays at 10pm and continuing until 1933. Beginning in 1932 NBC also carried his Song Sleuth which was heard Thursdays at 8:15pm. On Mutual he did Sigmund Spaeth's Musical Quiz on Sunday afternoons at 1:15pm from January 19 to March 23, 1947. He also appeared on Metropolitan Opera Quiz.

He was a charter member of the Iota chapter of Phi Mu Alpha Sinfonia at Northwestern University. He was awarded the 1958 Charles E. Lutton Man of Music Award for his contributions. Haverford College awarded him an honorary Doctor of Humane Letters in 1965.

Spaeth died in New York City at the age of 80.

Selected bibliography

Books

 Other volumes in the Music and Dance survey which were edited by Spaeth include Music and Dance in New York State, Music and Dance in Pennsylvania, New Jersey and Delaware, Music and Dance in the Southern States and Music and Dance in the Southeastern States.

Song collections (as editor)

 Spaeth provided "new singable translations of the German, French, Italian, and Russian songs".

Essays and reporting

(August 1928). "Jazz is not music." Forum: the magazine of controversy. 80 (2): 267–271.

Notes and references
Notes

References

External links

"Tune Detective", Time, August 22, 1932]
Sigmund Spaeth, Remington Records: Music Plus Series

1885 births
1965 deaths
American male composers
American composers
American radio personalities
Musicians from Philadelphia
Haverford College alumni
The New Yorker people
20th-century American musicologists
20th-century American male musicians